Ein wahrer Held (A True Hero), Op. 69, is an opera in three acts by Giselher Klebe who with his wife, Lore Klebe, also wrote the libretto based on the play The Playboy of the Western World by John Millington Synge.

The opera premiered on 18 January 1975 at the Opernhaus Zürich.

German-language operas
Operas by Giselher Klebe
1975 operas
Operas
Operas based on plays